Annah Gela is a South African politician of the African National Congress (ANC) who has been a Member of the National Assembly of South Africa since May 2019.

Background
Gela completed a municipal management development programme at the University of Pretoria. She also fulfilled a community facilitation programme through the Siyakhula Trust.

A member of the African National Congress, she served as its chief whip in the Westonaria Local Municipality from 2008 until 2016.

Parliamentary career
Prior to the 8 May 2019 general election, she was given the 22nd position on the ANC's Gauteng list of candidates for the National Assembly. She was elected to parliament at the election, and was sworn in as a Member of Parliament on 22 May 2019.

In parliament, she serves on the Portfolio Committee on Health.

References

External links
Profile at Parliament of South Africa

Living people
People from Gauteng
Year of birth missing (living people)
African National Congress politicians
Members of the National Assembly of South Africa
Women members of the National Assembly of South Africa